Denzel De Roeve (born 10 August 2004) is a Belgian footballer who currently plays as a midfielder for Club NXT.

Career statistics

Club

Notes

References

2004 births
Living people
Belgian footballers
Belgium youth international footballers
Association football midfielders
Challenger Pro League players
S.C. Eendracht Aalst players
Club NXT players